Streets is a 1990 American drama film directed by Katt Shea and starring Christina Applegate and David Mendenhall.

Plot
Dawn, a drug-addicted teen prostitute living on the streets of Los Angeles, and Sy, a teenager with dreams of becoming a rock star, become friends after Sy rescues Dawn from a violent john.  Dawn takes Sy under her wing and gives him a guided tour of the seedy underworld of Hollywood.

Cast
Christina Applegate as Dawn
David Mendenhall as Sy
Eb Lottimer as Lumley
Jane Chung as Old Bag Woman
Starr Andreeff as Policewoman on Horse
Alexander Folk as Bagley
Kay Lenz as Sargent 
J Bartell as Officer #1 (as J. Bartell)
Paul Ben-Victor as Officer #2
Tom Ruben as Officer #3
David Lawrence as Plumber
Patrick Richwood as Bob
Aron Eisenberg as Roach

Production
Katt Shea later recalled:
That was me just exploring the underside…I tend to really like to explore people I don’t know and so I started doing research on the streets and talking to people who lived on the streets. I did a lot of research and they thought I was a homeless person and I hung out with the kids and stuff and then wrote from that research. I knew a girl who was a heroin addict that we based "Dawn" on her. She lived on the street or sometimes she lived with a very rich boyfriend, which was very very strange.
Streets led to Shea being offered to direct the film Poison Ivy.

Home media
Streets was released on VHS in mid 1990 through MGM/UA Home Entertainment. A double feature DVD edition was released in 2011 as part of the Roger Corman's Cult Classics collection, through Shout! Factory.

References

External links

1990 films
Films about drugs
American independent films
Films set in Los Angeles
1990 drama films
1990s thriller films
Films directed by Katt Shea
Films about runaways
Teensploitation
1990s English-language films
1990s American films